The following lists events that happened during  1954 in New Zealand.

Population
 Estimated population as of 31 December: 2,118,400
 Increase since 31 December 1953: 43,700 (2.11%)
 Males per 100 females: 101.2

Incumbents

Regal and viceregal
Head of State – Elizabeth II, Queen of New Zealand, from 6 February 1952
Governor-General – Lieutenant-General The Lord Norrie GCMG GCVO CB DSO MC, from 1952 to 1957

Government
The 30th New Zealand Parliament expired this year. The National Party was elected to a third term in office under Sidney Holland on 13 November.

Speaker of the House – Matthew Oram from 1950 to 1957
Prime Minister – Sidney Holland from 13 December 1949 to 20 September 1957.
Deputy Prime Minister – Keith Holyoake from 13 December 1949 to 20 September 1957.
Minister of Finance – Sidney Holland until November, followed by Jack Watts
Minister of Foreign Affairs – Clifton Webb from 19 September 1951 to 26 November 1954, followed by Tom Macdonald
Chief Justice — Sir Harold Barrowclough

Parliamentary opposition 
 Leader of the Opposition –   Walter Nash (Labour).

Main centre leaders
Mayor of Auckland – John Luxford from 1953 to 1956
Mayor of Hamilton – Roderick Braithwaite from 1953 to 1959
Mayor of Wellington – Robert Macalister from 1950 to 1956
Mayor of Christchurch – Robert M. Macfarlane from 1938 to 1941 and again from 1950 to 1958
Mayor of Dunedin – Leonard Morton Wright from 1950 to 1959

Events 
 12 January: 50,000 people mass in Wellington as Elizabeth II attends the state opening of Parliament.
 30 January: The Royal tour by Queen Elizabeth II and The Duke of Edinburgh concludes at Bluff as they depart on the SS Gothic
23 June – Teenagers Pauline Parker and Juliet Hulme are arrested for the murder of Parker's mother.
20 September – the Mazengarb Report on Moral Delinquency in Children and Adolescents is presented to Parliament.
8 November – eighteen-year-old golf amateur Bob Charles causes a sensation by beating a top international field to win the New Zealand Golf Open
13 November – the National Party wins re-election at a general election
 Hastings becomes the first town in New Zealand to fluoridate its water supply.

Arts and literature

See 1954 in art, 1954 in literature

Music

See: 1954 in music

Radio
2 January – First radio episode of It's in the Bag, hosted by Selwyn Toogood

See: Public broadcasting in New Zealand

Film
The Seekers

See: :Category:1954 film awards, 1954 in film, List of New Zealand feature films, Cinema of New Zealand, :Category:1954 films

Sport

Athletics
 20 February: Yvette Williams breaks the world long jump record by jumping  at Gisborne.
 Edwin Rye wins his first national title in the men's marathon, clocking 2:35:45 on 6 March in Hamilton, New Zealand.

British Empire and Commonwealth Games

Chess
 The 61st National Chess Championship is held in Wellington, and is won by Ortvin Sarapu of Auckland (his third successive title).

Horse racing

Harness racing
 New Zealand Trotting Cup – Johnny Globe
 Auckland Trotting Cup – Caduceus

Lawn bowls
The national outdoor lawn bowls championships are held in Christchurch.
 Men's singles champion – Robin Andrew (Onehunga Bowling Club)
 Men's pair champions – N.A. McNabb, C.L. Spearman (skip) (Christchurch RSA Bowling Club)
 Men's fours champions – J. Rothwell, H.L. Rule, W. O'Neill, Pete Skoglund (skip) (Otahuhu Bowling Club)

Rugby union
 The All Blacks played four Test Matches on a tour of Europe:
 9 January, Lansdowne Road, Dublin: New Zealand 14 – 3 Ireland
 30 January, Twickenham, London: New Zealand 5 – 0 England
 13 February, Murrayfield, Edinburgh	New Zealand 3 – 0 Scotland
 27 February, Stade Colombes, Paris:	New Zealand 0 – 3 France

Soccer
 The national men's team undertook a 10-match tour of Australia, which included 3 internationals. They played one warm-up match prior to the tour.
 31 July, Wellington: NZ 6 – 0 Wellington
 3 August, Adelaide: NZ 3 – 2	South Australia
 7 August, Adelaide: NZ 3 – 1	Australian XI
 11 August, Melbourne: NZ 1 – 2 Victoria
 14 August, Melbourne: NZ 2 – 1	Australia
 18 August, Granville: NZ 0 – 3 Granville
 21 August, Sydney: NZ 4 – 1	New South Wales	Benge (2), Charlton, Olley
 25 August, Brisbane: NZ 2 – 2 Queensland	Smith, Steele
 28 August, Brisbane: NZ 1 – 4 Australia'
 29 August, Newcastle: NZ 1 – 1 Northern Districts	Smith
 4 September, Sydney: NZ 1 – 4 Australia
 5 September, Bulli: NZ 4 – 4	South Coast
 The Chatham Cup is won by Onehunga who beat Western of Christchurch 1–0 in the final.
 Provincial league champions:
	Auckland:	North Shore United
	Bay of Plenty:	Mangakino Utd
	Buller:	Millerton Thistle
	Canterbury:	Western
	Hawke's Bay:	Hastings Wanderers
	Manawatu:	Palmerston North United
	Nelson:	Settlers
	Northland:	Otangarei United
	Otago:	Northern
	Poverty Bay:	Eastern Union
	South Canterbury:	Northern Hearts
	Southland:	Brigadiers
	Taranaki:	Old Boys
	Waikato:	Huntly Thistle
	Wanganui:	New Settlers
	Wellington:	Stop Out

Births
 17 February: Brian Houston,  New Zealand-born Australian pastor.
 17 March: Peter Dunne, politician
 30 April: Jane Campion, film director.
 11 May: Murray Haszard, technology entrepreneur.
 20 May: Julie Brougham, Olympic equestrian (died 2021)
 15 June: Larry Ross, motorcycle speedway rider.
 17 June: Trevor Mallard, politician
 5 July: John Wright, cricket player and coach
 24 October: Tu Wyllie, politician
 18 November: Evan Gray, cricketer
 24 December: Graham Sligo, field hockey player
:Category:1954 births

Deaths
 7 May: Cyril Brownlie, rugby union player.
 26 May: Frederick Doidge, former cabinet minister and New Zealand High Commissioner (London)
 1 June: Charles E. Major, politician.
 5 June: Alexander Stuart, politician
 1 August: Arthur Stallworthy, politician.
 7 December: George William Smith, athlete, rugby union and league player.
 John Buckland Wright, engraver.

See also
List of years in New Zealand
Timeline of New Zealand history
History of New Zealand
Military history of New Zealand
Timeline of the New Zealand environment
Timeline of New Zealand's links with Antarctica

For world events and topics in 1954 not specifically related to New Zealand see: 1954

References

External links

 
Years of the 20th century in New Zealand